The 1879 South Warwickshire by-election was fought on 21 February 1879.  The byelection was fought due to the incumbent Conservative MP, Earl of Yarmouth, becoming comptroller of the Household.  It was retained by the unopposed Earl of Yarmouth.

References

1879 elections in the United Kingdom
1879 in England
19th century in Warwickshire
By-elections to the Parliament of the United Kingdom in Warwickshire constituencies
Unopposed by-elections to the Parliament of the United Kingdom in English constituencies